USS Calvert may refer to the following ships operated by the United States Navy:

 Calvert (SP-2274), was a Maryland State Fisheries Force motor boat that served in World War I
 , served in World War II

United States Navy ship names